The 2017–18 Megyei Bajnokság I includes the championships of 20 counties in Hungary. It is the fourth tier of the Hungarian football league system.

Bács-Kiskun

League table

Baranya

Békés

Borsod-Abaúj

See also
 2017–18 Magyar Kupa
 2018 Magyar Kupa Final
 2017–18 Nemzeti Bajnokság II
 2017–18 Nemzeti Bajnokság III

References

External links
  

1
Hungary
Megyei Bajnokság I